Norm Drucker (July 4, 1920 – February 6, 2015) was a major influence in professional basketball officiating for over 35 years. His NBA and ABA officiating career as both a referee and Supervisor of Officials spanned the careers of all-time pro basketball greats, from George Mikan, Bob Cousy, Dolph Schayes and Bob Pettit in the 1950s, to Wilt Chamberlain, Jerry West, Elgin Baylor and Bill Russell in the 1960s, to Julius Erving, Rick Barry, Bill Bradley and Walt Frazier in the 1970s and to Larry Bird and Magic Johnson in the 1980s.

Life and career
Drucker was born in New York City, New York. He was hired as a referee by the National Basketball Association in 1953. By the early 60's he was regularly officiating two to four games in the NBA Finals each season. In 1969, when the two-year-old American Basketball Association was raiding the NBA for talent, he took the risk, along with three other NBA "lead" referees  — Joe Gushue, Earl Strom and John Vanak — and jumped to the financially uncertain ABA. Their contracts were the first multi-year officiating contracts in pro basketball history. Such was Drucker's stature and reputation, that his total salary, as a referee and Supervisor of Officials, along with a $25,000 signing bonus, was more than double the average NBA player's salary. It made him, at that time, the highest paid referee in the history of basketball. Within a year, all other pro basketball officials benefited, as their salaries more than doubled. As a result, officiating professional basketball evolved from a part-time 'second job',  to a full-time career, with greatly improved working conditions, benefits and pension plans. It was the first time in history that a league had promoted the quality of its officials which improved the ABA's credibility, and as a by-product enhanced the public's interest in, and respect for referees.
 In the ABA, Drucker officiated and also served as the league's Supervisor of Officials.  With the ABA-NBA merger in 1976, Drucker was one of only a handful of ABA referees hired by the NBA to return.  When he retired after the 1976-77 NBA season to become the NBA's Supervisor of Officials, his 24 consecutive seasons of officiating was the longest string in pro basketball history. It remains the record for longest tenure for a pro referee among those whose entire career was during the era of only two referees per game.  During that span he officiated 6 All-Star Games (3 NBA, 3 ABA), a higher total than any other official in pro basketball history other than Mendy Rudolph and Earl Strom both of whom officiated seven. When he retired, his total of 38 NBA and ABA championship round games officiated was the second highest in pro basketball history.

In his 24-year officiating career (17 in the NBA and 7 in the ABA), Drucker was well known for his even-handed officiating for visiting teams in an era when many officials were criticized as "homers" - favoring the home team.  In a 1969 interview with Newsday's Stan Isaacs, he said, "I think there is a part of me deep down that enjoys calling a foul against the home team and then standing out there alone, almost defying the cries of the hometown mob."

For 14 seasons, from 1963 through 1977, Drucker along with Mendy Rudolph and Earl Strom, were generally recognized as the top referees in pro basketball.

As a result, assigning Drucker to "big games" was commonplace, and he officiated the deciding game of league championships eight times—four times in the NBA, in 1963, 1965, 1966 and 1968, and four times in the ABA, in 1971, 1972, 1974 and 1976. Of the nearly 400 referees who have officiated in the NBA and ABA, only two others Mendy Rudolph and Joe Crawford have officiated in more deciding games.
With a reputation for making "gutty calls"   and not "protecting" superstars he holds the distinction of being the only referee ever to eject Wilt Chamberlain from an NBA game, calling three technical fouls  on Chamberlain on January 3, 1962.

In the late 1950s and early 1960s he was involved in what the press called a heated "feud" with legendary Boston Celtic coach Red Auerbach. His second ejection of Auerbach in a one-month period led to the coach's 3-game suspension by NBA president Maurice Podoloff on November 13, 1961.

Drucker's career gave him a courtside view of key moments of the NBA's first 35 seasons. He was the last active NBA referee to have officiated in 1953-54—the last season before the NBA introduced the 24-second clock. That same season, he was selected to officiate the only regular-season game in NBA history that experimented with rims 12 feet, rather than 10 feet, off the ground.  He officiated the games when Bob Pettit scored his 15,000th career point and Wilt Chamberlain scored his 25,000th.

He officiated the last game in the history of the ABA—the deciding game 6 of the 1976 ABA Championship Series,  the deciding game of the 1963 NBA Finals, Bob Cousy's final game as a Boston Celtic, and the deciding game of the 1966 Finals, Red Auerbach's last game.

Drucker is also the link to referees whose careers span the entire history of the NBA. He partnered on the court with Sid Borgia and Hall of Fame Referee Pat Kennedy whose NBA careers started in the NBA's first season, 1946–47, and as the NBA's Supervisor of Officials, Drucker hired Joe Crawford, who was still officiating during the 2015-16 season.

At the end of his officiating career, Drucker demonstrated a commitment to improving the salary, benefits and working conditions for future generations of professional referees. By 2013, top NBA referees were earning $550,000 for the regular season http://www.therichest.com/sports/highest-paid-nba-referees/ -- more than ten times the 2012 U.S. median family income of $51,371. https://www.census.gov/prod/2013pubs/acsbr12-02.pdf

 In 1977, he, along with 23 of the NBA's 25 other referees went on strike before the playoffs. At 56 years old, and about to retire, he noted at the time, "I'm not going to be the recipient of the benefits [of a collective bargaining agreement] ... I could have made a good deal for myself [by not striking]. Any one of the top 14 lead referees could have. But if we went, the bottom 14 referees wouldn't have any power. [The NBA] would tear [the referees] up."  After 16 days, the strike was settled with the NBA, for the first time, recognizing the referee's union. Drucker worked what remained of the 1977 playoffs and retired. Within three years, the salary and benefits for each top NBA referee increased by $100,000 per year. As he predicted, he shared in none of the improved salary and working conditions enjoyed by future generations of professional referees.

Despite having picketed and engaged in media interviews during the strike to bring pressure on the NBA, within four months the NBA hired him as its Supervisor of Officials. Overall, Drucker supervised and taught other referees for 10 seasons, six in the NBA, two as a crew chief (1967–1969) and four as the NBA's Supervisor of Officials (1977–81) and four as the ABA's Supervisor of the Officials (1969–73). His decade as a referee administrator had a substantial impact on NBA playing rules and improving the quality of basketball officiating.

As the NBA's Supervisor of Officials, he was one of the first NBA executives to publicly advocate the adoption of the ABA's three-point basket and the use of three referees per game.  The NBA adopted the three-point basket in 1979 and adopted the three-man officiating system for the 1978–79 season, although the league returned to two officials the next season.  The three-official system returned in the 1988–89 season and has been used by the NBA ever since. As an administrator in the ABA and NBA, he recruited and/or trained young referees, many of whom had long, successful NBA careers, including Joe Crawford, Bernie Fryer, Ed Middleton, Jake O'Donnell, Jack Nies, Jim Clark, Wally Rooney, and Jess Kersey.

Also, during his tenure he created the first formal pro basketball referee training program when the NBA contracted with the Continental Basketball Association, at that time the top pro basketball minor league.  Under the program, the NBA selected, trained and financially subsidized the CBA officiating staff and hired the CBA's Supervisor of Officials. The training program's success extended decades beyond Drucker's career. By 2000, nine of the 12 referees who officiated the NBA Finals were graduates of the CBA training program.  By 2008, 96% of all NBA referees had trained in the NBA's minor league training programs. Today, minor league training and development is the accepted norm for an NBA officiating career.

Also during Drucker's tenure as Supervisor, he instituted the first professionally administered psychological profiling for NBA referees, to evaluate what personality traits were most common among great referees. Among the findings, said Drucker, was that to be a great referee "you've got to love [basketball] to succeed at it."

After his retirement as Supervisor, the NBA honored him as an "All-Star" referee in the first three NBA "Legends" Games, which showcased retired NBA all-stars in an old-timer's game during NBA All-Star Weekends.  Always a bit of a showman, he hit All-Star Coach Red Auerbach with a technical foul in the 1984 game, eliciting laughter from players and NBA executives, and fittingly, renewed anger from Auerbach.

Drucker's basketball career began as player where he learned the game from the first generation of basketball superstars. He played high school basketball at Erasmus Hall High School in Brooklyn starting in 1937, in an era when there was no 3-second rule, goal tending was permitted and there was a jump ball after every basket. He played college basketball at City College of New York (CCNY) under Hall of Fame Coach Nat Holman. Holman, a star in the 1930s was often referred to as "the world's best basketball player". Drucker's 1941-42 CCNY team, which included future New York Knick coach and Hall of Famer Red Holzman, was ranked #3 in the country and advanced to the NIT championship tournament, the preeminent post-season tournament of that era. As a part-time starter,  The New York Times called Drucker "aggressive, alert and spirited".

In January 1943, World War II interrupted Drucker's college career. In the U.S. Army for 3 1/2 years, he served in Europe and was discharged a first Lieutenant.

After the war, Drucker played professionally in the New York State Professional Basketball League for the Troy Celtics Later, he was traded to the Trenton Tigers in the American Basketball League and played on their 1946-47 championship team.

In 1949, Drucker began his officiating career refereeing AAU, high school, collegiate, and American Basketball League games.  Two years later he refereed one NBA game and in 1953 he moved up to the NBA with a full schedule of games. In 1989, Drucker came out of retirement and joined the World Basketball League, a minor league, as its Supervisor of Officials, a position he held for the four-year life of that league.

Drucker was inducted into the CCNY Athletic Hall of Fame in 1986. In 1994, he was inducted into the New York City Basketball Hall of Fame for his officiating career and was also inducted in 1998 into the National Jewish Sports Hall of Fame.

His son, Jim Drucker, served as commissioner of two professional sports leagues, the Continental Basketball Association from 1978 to 1986 and the Arena Football League from 1994 to 1996, and was ESPN's legal correspondent from 1989 to 1993.

Drucker retired to East Norriton, Pennsylvania, and died in 2015.

References

External links
 Norm Drucker's Biography at Jews in Sports

1920 births
2015 deaths
American Basketball Association referees
Basketball players from New York (state)
CCNY Beavers men's basketball players
Erasmus Hall High School alumni
Jewish American sportspeople
Jewish men's basketball players
National Basketball Association referees
Sportspeople from Brooklyn
American men's basketball players